Turning a blind eye is an idiom describing the ignoring of undesirable information.

Although the Oxford English Dictionary records usage of the phrase as early as 1698,
the phrase to turn a blind eye is often attributed to an incident in the life of Vice Admiral Horatio Nelson.  Nelson was blinded in one eye early in his Royal Navy career.  During the Battle of Copenhagen in 1801 the cautious Admiral Sir Hyde Parker, in overall command of the British forces, sent a signal to Nelson's forces ordering them to discontinue the action.  Naval orders were transmitted via a system of signal flags at that time.  When this order was brought to the more aggressive Nelson's attention, he lifted his telescope up to his blind eye, saying, "I have a right to be blind sometimes. I really do not see the signal," and most of his forces continued to press home the attack. The frigates supporting the line-of-battle ships did break off, in one case suffering severe losses in the retreat.

There is a misconception that the order was to be obeyed at Nelson's discretion, but this is contradicted by the fact that it was a general order to all the attacking ships (some of whom did break off), and that later that day Nelson openly stated that he had "fought contrary to orders". Sir Hyde Parker was recalled in disgrace and Nelson appointed Commander-in-Chief of the fleet following the battle.

See also
Three wise monkeys
Willful blindness
Cognitive dissonance
Blue wall of silence

References

External links
 

Concepts in ethics
English phrases